The Saxon Loess Fields refer to a natural region that lies mainly within the state of Saxony in central Germany. In addition, small areas of this region extend to the northwest and west into Saxony-Anhalt (the land around Weißenfels), to the southeast into Thuringia (the region around Altenburg) and to the northeast into Brandenburg. It more-or-less combines the BfN's major regions listed as D19 Saxon Upland and Ore Mountain Foreland, (Sächsisches Hügelland und Erzgebirgsvorland) and D14, Upper Lusatia (Oberlausitz); only the range of Central Uplands hills, the Lusatian Mountains, has been excluded and instead forms part of the Saxon Highlands and Uplands (Sächsisches Bergland und Mittelgebirge).

Natural regions 

The following list breaks down the region into major units based on Meynen (three-figure numbers). New major units, that combine the earlier ones, are arranged above these without any preceding numbers (Locations defined in brackets).

 Saxon Loess Fields
 (major groupings no longer used)
 44 (=D14) Upper Lusatia (except 441 - Lusatian Highlands)
 Eastern Upper Lusatia
 440 Neiße trough (east and south)
 442 East Lusatian Foothills (west)
 444 Upper Lusatian Fields
 West Lusatian Upland and Highlands
 443 West Lusatian Foothills (southeast to northeast)
 D 19 Saxon Upland and Ore Mountain Foreland 
 46 Saxon Upland or Saxon Uplands (including Leipziger Land)
 (continuation of the West Lusatian Upland and Highlands)
 461 Lusatian Plateau (west)
 460 Dresden Basin
 462 Großenhain Pflege 
 463 Central Saxon Loess Upland
 North Saxon Plateau and Upland
 464 Oschatz Upland (east) 
 465 Grimma Porphyric Upland (west)
 466 Altenburg-Zeitz Loess Upland
 467 Leipziger Land
 45 Ore Mountain Foreland
 450 Mulde Loess Hills
 451 Ore Mountain Basin
 452 Upper Pleißeland (west of the basin; nowadays usually counted as part of it)

See also 

Natural regions of Germany

References 

Natural regions of Germany